Geoffrey Carter (14 February 1943 – 19 March 2018) was an English professional footballer who played as a winger.

Career
Born in Northwich, Carter played for Moulton, West Bromwich Albion, Bury, Bradford City, Darlaston Town, Parkdale, and Greaves.

He played for Bradford City between August 1967 and September 1967, making 1 appearance in the Football League.

He died in March 2018, after suffering from leukemia and a stroke.

Citations

References
 

1943 births
2018 deaths
English footballers
West Bromwich Albion F.C. players
Bury F.C. players
Bradford City A.F.C. players
Darlaston Town F.C. players
English Football League players
Association football wingers
Sportspeople from Northwich